The United States Army Security Agency (ASA) was the United States Army's signals intelligence branch from 1945 to 1976. The Latin motto of the Army Security Agency was Semper Vigiles (Vigilant Always), which echoes the declaration, often mistakenly attributed to Thomas Jefferson, that "The price of liberty is eternal vigilance."

Although most ASA units focused upon SIGINT (signals intelligence) most if not all ASA units contained HUMINT (human intelligence) specialists as well, mostly interrogators and counter-intelligence specialists. At the end of the Cold War era, some ASA units also were staffed with ELINT (electronic intelligence) specialists and warrant officers, which incorporated field ECM (electronic counter-measures and field ECCM (electronic counter-countermeasures) such as tactical jammers, direction finders, electronic signal decoys, and captured/repurposed Warsaw Pact radio and communications equipment.

The Agency existed between 1945 and 1977 and was the successor to the Army Signals Intelligence Service, operations that dated to World War I. ASA was under the operational control of the Director of the National Security Agency (DIRNSA), located at Fort Meade, Maryland. It had its own tactical commander at Headquarters, ASA, at Arlington Hall Station, Virginia. Besides intelligence gathering, it had responsibility for the security of Army communications and for electronic countermeasures operations. In 1977, the ASA was merged with the US Army's Military Intelligence component to create the United States Army Intelligence and Security Command (INSCOM). However, the last separate ASA field unit (the 523rd ASA, an Army Reserve unit based at Fort Snelling, Minnesota) existed until 1976.

History
Composed of soldiers trained in radio communication, cryptography, military intelligence and linguists trained at the Defense Language Institute located at the Presidio of Monterey, California, the ASA was tasked with monitoring and interpreting military communications of the Soviet Union, the People's Republic of China, and their allies and client states around the world. The agency was established after World War II, when the Soviet Union and the US had been allies. In the postwar years, after the Soviet Union and communist governments gained power in eastern Europe and China, they became enemies in the Cold War between Communist states and allies, and the US and western nations. The ASA was directly subordinate to the National Security Agency, and all major field stations had NSA technical representatives present.

All gathered information had time-sensitive value, depending on its importance and classification. Information was passed through intelligence channels within hours of intercept for the lowest-priority items, but in as little as 10 minutes for the most highly critical information.

ASA personnel were stationed at locations around the globe, wherever the United States had a military presence. They were sometimes publicly acknowledged. In some cases, such as in Asmara, Eritrea, they constituted the primary US military presence. Other sites included Chitose, Japan; Sinop, Turkey; Kagnew Station, Ethiopia, and the Panama Canal Zone. A former field station outside Harrogate, England, in what is now North Yorkshire, was a primary listening post that the US turned over to the British in the postwar years. They adapted it as a Royal Air Force (RAF)  station. It is called RAF Menwith Hill and has been the site of peace protests. There was also a listening post set up at Schneeberg Mountain, Germany. 

During the height of the Cold War, personnel from the 326 ASA Company stationed at Ft. Bragg, North Carolina, relocated classified mobile communications equipment to Homestead Air Force Base in Miami–Dade County, Florida. In 1962, they developed the precursor to the 6th USASA Field Station (Seminole Station). U.S. overflights photographed and discovered offensive nuclear weapons placed in Cuba by Soviet allies. Cuba became a live mission before, during and after the Cuban Missile Crisis. The US forced the Soviet Union to remove the weapons.

Vietnam War
ASA personnel of the 3rd Radio Research Unit were covertly designated as Radio Research and were among the earliest U.S. military personnel in Vietnam. The 3rd later expanded to become the 509th Radio Research Group.

The first ASA soldier to be killed on the battlefield in Vietnam was Specialist 4 James T. Davis (from Livingston, Tennessee). He was killed on 22 December 1961, on a road near the old French garrison of Cau Xang. He had been assigned to the 3rd Radio Research Unit at Tan Son Nhut Airport near Saigon, along with 92 other members of his unit. Davis Station, at Tan Son Nhut, was named after him.

Most ASA personnel processed "in country" through Davis Station. Others attached to larger command structures prior to transport to Vietnam processed in with those units. ASA personnel were attached to Army infantry and armored cavalry units throughout the Vietnam War. Some teams were also attached to the Studies and Observation Group of Military Assistance Command Vietnam and special forces units. Assigned to the 5th Special Forces Group (Airborne) based out of Nha Trang was the 403rd Radio Research Group, Special Operations Detachment (SOD). SOD forces were deployed to Operational Detachment base camps throughout South Vietnam. Other teams, such as the 313th Radio Research Battalion at Nha Trang, were independent of other army units. ASA personnel were kept in Vietnam after the 1973 pullout of US Army combat forces; they were finally withdrawn with other US personnel at the Fall of Saigon in April 1975.

References

Military units and formations established in 1945
Defunct United States intelligence agencies
Signals intelligence units and formations